Adele Audrey Ann Spence (born 12 April 1974 in Dublin, Republic of Ireland) is an Irish cricketer who has played 8 women's one-day internationals. She is a right-hand bat and bowls right-arm offbreak.

References

1974 births
Living people
Cricketers from Dublin (city)
Irish women cricketers
Ireland women One Day International cricketers